Uvarovo is a rural locality (a village) in Kurilovskoye Rural Settlement, Sobinsky District, Vladimir Oblast, Russia. The population was 16 as of 2010.

Geography 
Uvarovo is located 12 km north of Sobinka (the district's administrative centre) by road. Fyodorovka is the nearest rural locality.

References 

Rural localities in Sobinsky District